The 2005 FC Dallas season was the ninth season of the Major League Soccer team. The season saw many changes from the previous season. In August, the team moved from their longtime home of the Cotton Bowl to the new soccer-specific Pizza Hut Park in Frisco. Coinciding with the move, the team was rebranded as FC Dallas. This included changing the jerseys from predominantly red to white with red stripes and changing the color scheme from red and black to red, white, and blue. The team also changed its logo. Overall, the season was deemed a success by some because the team returned to the playoffs for the first time in three years. The team also reached the Championship Game of the U.S. Open Cup.

Final standings

Regular season

Playoffs

Western Conference semifinals

U.S. Open Cup

External links
 Season statistics

2005
Dallas
FC Dallas
FC Dallas